Allgeier is a surname. Notable people with the surname include:

Brian Allgeier (born 1971), American video game designer
Elizabeth Allgeier (1941–2016), American psychologist and sexologist
Peter Allgeier, American trade representative and lawyer
Sepp Allgeier (1895–1968), German cinematographer
Tyler Allgeier (born 2000), American football player